Analytic and enumerative statistical studies are two types of scientific studies:

In any statistical study the ultimate aim is to provide a rational basis for action. Enumerative and analytic studies differ by where the action is taken. Deming first published on this topic in 1942. Deming summarized the distinction between enumerative and analytic studies as follows:

These terms were introduced in Some Theory of Sampling (1950, Chapter 7) by W. Edwards Deming.

In other words, an enumerative study is a statistical study in which the focus is on judgment of results, and an analytic study is one in which the focus is on improvement of the process or system which created the results being evaluated and which will continue creating results in the future. A statistical study can be enumerative or analytic, but it cannot be both.

Statistical theory in enumerative studies is used to describe the precision of estimates and the validity of hypotheses for the population studied. In analytical studies, the standard error of a statistic does not address the most important source of uncertainty, namely, the change in study conditions in the future. Although analytical studies need to take into account the uncertainty due to sampling, as in enumerative studies, the attributes of the study design and analysis of the data primarily deal with the uncertainty resulting from extrapolation to the future (generalisation to the conditions in future time periods). The methods used in analytical studies encourage the exploration of mechanisms through multifactor designs, contextual variables introduced through blocking and replication over time.

This distinction between enumerative and analytic studies is the theory behind the Fourteen Points for Management. Dr. Deming's philosophy is that management should be analytic instead of enumerative. In other words, management should focus on improvement of processes for the future instead of on judgment of current results.

Statistician Dr. Mike Tveite has pointed out the dangers of attempting to use an enumerative study for prediction.

Co-presenter and author Henry Neave discusses the issues associated with enumerative and analytic studies along with the many contributions made by Deming in his 1990 book, "The Deming Dimension {reference added} and the 12 Days to Deming Course made accessible by the British Deming Association at: http://www.franbo.uk/deming/the-course/

Provost wrote about the distinction of analytic studies in health care.

Notes 

Neave HR. The deming dimension. Knoxville, Tenn: SPC Press; 1990:440.

External links
   On the distinction between enumerative and analytic surveys by W. Edwards Deming

Neave HR. The deming dimension. Knoxville, Tenn: SPC Press; 1990:440.

Philosophy of statistics
Quality